Synchronicity LA is an arts-focused intentional community located in the Harvard Heights neighborhood of Los Angeles, California.

Founded in 2008, Synchronicity resides in a nine-bedroom Craftsman home built in 1910.  A portion of community members' rent goes toward the purchase of kitchen and gardening supplies, and members have access to a shared music room and production studio.  The kitchen features bar-grade beer taps serving cheaper beer at $1 per pint and a more expensive beer for $2.  Synchronicity hosts community meals four nights a week, and members share cooking duties based on rotation.

On the second Saturday of each month, Synchronicity hosts a monthly salon where members and outsiders may showcase their work.

References

External links 

2008 establishments in California
Art in Greater Los Angeles
Harvard Heights, Los Angeles
Housing cooperatives in the United States
Intentional communities in California